"(Can't Live Without Your) Love and Affection" is a song by American rock band Nelson. It was released in 1990 on DGC Records and backed with "Will You Love Me?". The song was based on a crush on Cindy Crawford. The music video features model and actress Judie Aronson who first appears on the cover of a magazine called "Vague", a parody of Vogue magazine. 

The song topped the Billboard Hot 100 on September 29, 1990, becoming the only single from the band to top the chart. This made the Nelson family, in which Nelson's own Matthew and Gunnar Nelson are the sons of Ricky Nelson, the only family to have three generations of number one singles.

The production on the single and its B-side, "Will You Love Me?", was done by David Thoener and Marc Tanner. It also appears as the first track on Nelson's album, After the Rain.  The song is used in Beavis and Butt-Head.  American boyband Natural covered the song for their 2002 album Keep It Natural.

Charts

Weekly charts

Year-end charts

References

1990 songs
1990 debut singles
Billboard Hot 100 number-one singles
Cashbox number-one singles
Geffen Records singles
Songs written by Marc Tanner
Nelson (band) songs